Fowlers Bay Conservation Park (previously known as the Fowlers Bay Conservation Reserve) is a protected area located in the west of South Australia on the coastline of the Great Australian Bight in the gazetted locality of Fowlers Bay.  The conservation park is classified as an IUCN Category VI protected area.

The historic Whale Bone Area and Point Fowler Look-Out Structure within the conservation park are listed on the South Australian Heritage Register as designated places of archaeological significance.

References

External links
Parks of the Far West official brochure
Fowlers Bay Conservation Park webpage on protected planet

Conservation parks of South Australia
Protected areas established in 1993
1993 establishments in Australia